Aston Bay is a suburb of Jeffreys Bay in Sarah Baartman District Municipality in the Eastern Cape province of South Africa.  It incorporates Marina Martinique, a large residential marina.

It was established as a fishing village in the 1850s.

References

Populated places in the Kouga Local Municipality
Populated coastal places in South Africa